Hapalips texanus is a species of pleasing fungus beetle in the family Erotylidae. It is found in North America. They are elongate and have a shining upper surface.

References

Further reading

 

Erotylidae
Articles created by Qbugbot
Beetles described in 1910